

ne

nea-neg
nealbarbital (INN)
nebacumab (INN)
Nebcin
nebicapone (INN)
nebidrazine (INN)
nebivolol (INN)
nebracetam (INN)
nebramycin (INN)
Nebupent
necopidem (INN)
nedaplatin (INN)
nedocromil (INN)
nefazodone (INN)
nefiracetam (INN)
neflumozide (INN)
nefopam (INN)
Neggram

nel-nem
neldazosin (INN)
nelezaprine (INN)
nelfinavir (INN)
nelotanserin (USAN, INN)
neltenexine (INN)
nelzarabine (INN)
nemadectin (INN)
nemazoline (INN)
Nembutal
nemifitide (USAN)
nemonapride (INN)
nemorubicin (INN)

neo
Neo Tect Kit
Neo-Cort-Dome
Neo-Cortef
Neo-Delta-Cortef
Neo-Fradin
Neo-Hydeltrasol
Neo-Medrol
Neo-Polycin
Neo-Rx
Neo-Synalar

neoa-neot
neoarsphenamine (INN)
Neobiotic
neocinchophen (INN)
Neodecadron
neomycin (INN)
Neopap
Neopasalate
Neopham 6.4%
Neoral
Neosar
Neoscan
Neosporin
neostigmine bromide (INN)
Neothylline
Neotrizine

nep-nes
nepadutant (INN)
nepafenac (INN)
nepaprazole (INN)
Nephramine 5.4%
Nephroflow
nepicastat (INN)
nepinalone (INN)
neptamustine (INN)
Neptazane
nequinate (INN)
neramexane mesylate (USAN)
neraminol (INN)
neratinib (USAN)
nerbacadol (INN)
nerelimomab (INN)
neridronic acid (INN)
nerisopam (INN)
nerispirdine (INN)
Nesacaine
nesapidil (INN)
nesbuvir (USAN)
nesertide (INN)
nesosteine (INN)
nestifylline (INN)

net-nex
neticonazole (INN)
netilmicin (INN)
netivudine (INN)
netobimin (INN)
netoglitazone (USAN)
Netromycin
netupitant (USAN)
Neulasta (Amgen, Inc)
Neumega (Genetics Institute, Inc)
Neupogen (Amgen)
Neuramate
Neurolite
Neurontin
neutral insulin injection (INN)
neutramycin (INN)
Neutrexin
nevirapine (INN)
Nevrin (RO)
nexeridine (INN)
Nexium
nexopamil (INN)